Launceston College is a government comprehensive senior secondary school located in Launceston, Tasmania, Australia. Established in 1913 as the Launceston State High School and subsequently known as Launceston College, the college caters for approximately 1,500 students in Years 11 and 12, and an optional Year 13. The college is administered by the Tasmanian Department of Education.

In 2019 student enrolments were 1,430. The college principal is Vicki Mackrill. The college has an International Student Program.

Facilities 
The college is located on a site that was the location of the former Launceston Female Factory and Gaol, built in 1834, and is listed on the Tasmanian Heritage Register.
 
Originally named Launceston State High School, the college became Launceston Matriculation College in 1967, and subsequently Launceston Community College to reflect its broader academic curriculum and vocational influence, and then Launceston College.

The campus stretches over two city blocks and incorporates a gymnasium complex including a swimming pool with sauna and spa, two basketball courts, rock climbing wall, full weights gym and squash courts. It has a commercial equipped training restaurant, an FM radio station, automotive workshop and television studio.  The Launceston College on air radio station (LCFM) can be found on the FM frequency of 87.8 and is also streamed to the web.

Co-curricular activities
The college also offers the yearly opportunity to students to be involved in stage productions. Since 2008, the college has presented Rent (Schools Edition), Grease, Flashdance, Matilda, In the Heights, Rock of Ages, Bring It On, Aida, the remake of Footloose, Hairspray, and Seussical. Earlier productions have been Chess, Mechanics of Love, Copacabana, Cinderocka, Jesus Christ Superstar, Footloose, Grease, Hair, High School Musical, All Shook Up, Disco Inferno, and Back To The 80s.

The school also offers overseas travel opportunities.

Publications 
The college has produced several publications since 1913, such as:

 The Northern Churinga (1914–1966)
 Churinga (1967 – present)
 The history of the Launceston State High School, 1913-1966 and Launceston Matriculation College, 1967-1976
 Prospectus'
 LC in ... : Orientation Guide 100 years of excellence: Launceston State High School to Launceston College 1913–2013''

Headmasters and principals

Launceston State High School

Launceston Matriculation College

Launceson Community College

Launceston College

See also
Australian Convict Sites
Cascades Female Factory
 List of schools in Tasmania
 Education in Tasmania

References 

Colleges in Tasmania
Schools in Launceston, Tasmania
Tasmanian Heritage Register
Educational institutions established in 1913
1913 establishments in Australia